Budden is a surname. Notable people with the surname include:

 Henry Budden (1871–1944), Australian architect
 Joe Budden (born 1980), American rapper
 Julian Budden (1924–2007), British opera scholar and broadcaster
 Lionel Bailey Budden (1877–1956), British architect and academic

See also
Kent & Budden
Kent Budden & Greenwell
Budden & Greenwell